Arteixo is a municipality in the Province of A Coruña, part of the autonomous community of Galicia in northwestern Spain. Its area is 93.76 km2 and its population is 31,005 (2013). Its population density is 317.43 people/km2.

It is an industrial town that belongs to A Coruña metropolitan area.

Notable landmarks are a Repsol refinery - with its associated industry - and the corporate headquarters of Inditex which is better known for its worldwide chain of clothing stores, Zara.

It also has tungsten, titanium and tin mines.

As of 2007, the Outer Harbour of A Coruña is being built here, in the Punta Langosteira Peninsula, to replace the busy harbour that is now in the city centre. The construction is planned to finish in 2020.

Demographics

Geography
It is drained by rivers Seixedo and Arteixo.

References

Municipalities in the Province of A Coruña